The Iceman Tapes: Conversations with a Killer and The Iceman Confesses: Secrets of a Mafia Hitman (also known as The Iceman: Confessions of a Mafia Hitman) are two documentaries that feature the Mafia hitman Richard Kuklinski. They were produced by HBO and released in 1992 and 2001, respectively.

After years of silence, "The Iceman" speaks, in two interviews a decade apart, Richard Kuklinski, a notorious top enforcer for the Gambino crime family, tells his unusual and gruesome story. Raised on—and immune to—violence, he kept his job and tactics a secret from his adoring family. In 1986, after a long investigation, Kuklinski was betrayed by "the only friend I didn't kill" and when interviewed was serving multiple life sentences.

References

Gambino crime family
2001 documentary films
2001 television films
2001 films
HBO documentary films
Works about contract killers
2000s English-language films
2000s American films